Peter-Jürgen Sanmann (5 August 1935 – 15 March 2016) was a German professional footballer who played in the 1950s and 1960s. He played as forward or winger.

Career
Sanmann played youth football with SC Concordia von 1907 in Hamburg. Playing for the amateur league team, he was nominated by national coach Sepp Herberger for the debut game of the newly launched junior national team (U–23) for the international match against Yugoslavia in Frankfurt on 25 June 1955. In the 3–3 draw, he played on the left wing and scored a goal.

Sanmann signed his first professional contract with FC Basel's club chairman Jules Düblin. He joined their first team for their 1955–56 season under trainer Béla Sárosi. After playing in two test matches, Sanmann played his domestic league debut for his new club in the away game on 28 August 1955 as Basel were defeated 2–0 by Chiasso. He scored his first goal for his club on 11 September in the away game as Basel drew 2–2 with Schaffhausen.

Between the years 1955 and 1957 Sanmann played a total of 67 games for Basel scoring a total of 18 goals. 45 of these games were in the Nationalliga A, six in the Swiss Cup and 16 were friendly games. He scored 14 goals in the domestic league, three in the cup and the other was scored during the test games.

After his two seasons with FC Basel, Sanmann returned to his club of origin, who at this time had just been promoted to the Oberliga Nord, the top tier of Germann football at this time. Sanmann then played for SC Concordia von 1907 until the end of his active playing career. He played his last league game on 21 April 1962 in a 3–2 home defeat against VfR Neumünster. In this game he played on the left wing and scored a goal.

Sanmann lived in his home town Hamburg until he died on 15 March 2016.

References

Sources
 Die ersten 125 Jahre. Publisher: Josef Zindel im Friedrich Reinhardt Verlag, Basel. 
 Verein "Basler Fussballarchiv" Homepage

1935 births
2016 deaths
German footballers
Association football forwards
FC Basel players
SC Concordia von 1907 players